Jaroslava Pencová (born 24 June 1990) is a Slovak female volleyball player. She is part of the Slovakia women's national volleyball team. She competed at the 2019 Women's European Volleyball Championship.

Clubs
  ŠŠK Bilíkova Bratislava (none–2006)
  Doprastav Bratislava (2006–2013)
  Dresdner SC (2013–2015)
  Lokomotiv Baku (2015–2016)
  BKS Bielsko-Biala (2017–2017)
  SAB Volley Legnano (2017–2018)
  Grot Budowlani Lodž (2018–present)

References

External links 

 Profile on CEV

1990 births
Living people
Slovak women's volleyball players
Sportspeople from Bratislava